This is a list of all Basic Education High Schools, the predominant type of Secondary education in Myanmar.

Arrawady Region

BEHS 1, Labutta
BEHS 2, Labutta
BEHS Myoma, Labutta
BEHS 3mile Myothit, Labutta
No.9 Basic Education High School, Pathein (Former No.6 Basic Education Middle School)

Mandalay Region

BEHS 1 Tatkon
BEHS 2 Mandalay
BEHS 8 Mandalay
BEHS 9 Mandalay
BEHS 14 Mandalay
BEHS 17 Mandalay
BEHS 15 Mandalay , It was also known as BTN during colonial days.
BEHS 16 Mandalay
BEHS 1 Meiktila

Mon State

Basic Education High School No. 9 Mawlamyine
Basic Education High School No. 1 Mudon
Basic Education High School No. 6 Mawlamyine

Yangon Region
BEHS 3 Ahlon
BEHS 4 Ahlon
BEHS 6 Ahlon
BEHS 2 Bahan
BEHS 2 Botataung
BEHS 4 Botataung
BEHS 5 Botataung
BEHS 6 Botataung
BEHS 1 Dagon
BEHS 2 Dagon
BEHS 3 Dagon
BEHS 1 Insein
Practising High School Yangon University of Education (TTC Kamayut)
BEHS 1 Kamayut
BEHS 2 Kamayut
BEHS 3 Kamayut
BEHS 4 Kamayut
BEHS 5 Kamayut
BEHS 1 Lanmadaw
BEHS 2 Lanmadaw
BEHS 1 Latha
BEHS 2 Latha
BEHS 2 Pabedan
BEHS 2 Sanchaung
BEHS 1 Shwepyitha
BEHS 2 Shwepyitha
BEHS 3 Shwepyitha
BEHS 4 Shwepyitha
BEHS 3 Mingaladon
BEHS 2 Sanchaung
BEHS 3 Mayangone
BEHS 2 Mingalardon
BEHS 1 Tamwe
BEHS 2 Tamwe
BEHS 3 Tamwe
BEHS 4 Tamwe
BEHS 5 Tamwe
BEHS 1 Yankin
BEHS 2 Yankin

Kayin State

B.E.H.S - Tagondaing

Thaninntayi Region 

 B.E. H.S -Myeik

Secondary schools in Myanmar
Myanmar
High schools
High Schools